90th Guards Tank Vitebsk-Novgorod Twice Red Banner Division (Military Unit Number 86274) is a Russian armoured division. The division was formed by December 2016 in the Central Military District.

History

Establishment 
The 90th Guards Tank Division was reformed by December 2016 in the Central Military District, carrying on the lineage of the 90th Guards Rifle Division. The division inherited the awards and history of the 6th Guards Motor Rifle Division, the former 90th Guards Rifle Division. The division was formed in accordance with an order of the Supreme Commander-in-Chief of the Russian Armed Forces and decree of the Russian Defence Minister dated 13 September 2016. The division is based in the Chelyabinsk and Sverdlovsk Oblasts. The division was formed form the 7th Separate Guards Tank Brigade, whose traditions were continued by the 239th Guards Tank Regiment, and the 32nd Separate Motor Rifle Brigade, perpetuated by the 228th Motor Rifle Regiment. To continue the heritage of the 30th Ural Volunteer Tank Corps, the tank battalion of the 228th Motor Rifle Regiment was designated as the Ural Tank Battalion.

On 19 August 2017, the 90th anniversary of the division and the 76th anniversary of the 239th Guards Tank Regiment were solemnly celebrated. A reconstruction of the seizure of Vitebsk (in Belarus) was organized, in which the T-34/85 tank was involved. Demonstration performances of the servicemen of the reconnaissance battalion took place. The company of the Guard of Honor of the Central Military District demonstrated combat bearing and possession of weapons. The division's amateur art ensemble performed.

On June 30, 2018, an ukaz of President Vladimir Putin officially conferred the honorifics Guards Vitebsk-Novgorod upon the division, while the 6th Tank Regiment became the 6th Guards Lvov Tank Regiment and the 400th Self-Propelled Artillery Regiment received the honorific Transylvania.

2022 Russian invasion of Ukraine 
On February 24, 2022, the division participated in the 2022 Kyiv offensive during the initial stage of the Russian invasion of Ukraine to the north-east of Kyiv.  The 90th Guards Tank Division had two battalion tactical groups involved in the three-week Battle of Brovary, where the division suffered significant losses in personnel and equipment.  The Ukrainian Ministry of Defence reported on 10 March 2022 that the commander of the 6th Guards Lvov Tank Regiment, Colonel Andrey Zakharov, was killed in the battle.

By late March, the division, along with other Russian units, began a hasty retreat out of Kyiv Oblast. Afterwards, the division redeployed to Eastern Ukraine, receiving BMPT Terminator tank support combat vehicles to join the Russian Airborne Forces fighting in Lysychansk.

On Friday 9th December 2022, the British government sanctioned the commander of the division (Colonel Ramil Rakhmatulovich Ibatullin) along with 30 other individuals. The sanctions, co-ordinated with international allies, were taken to mark International Anti-Corruption Day on Friday and Human Rights Day on Saturday.

Composition and Equipment

Composition
 Headquarters
 26th Separate Medical Battalion
 30th Separate Reconnaissance Battalion
 33rd Separate Signal Battalion
 351st Separate Engineer Sapper Battalion
 1122nd Separate Supply Battalion
 6th Guards Lvov Tank Regiment
 80th Guards Tank Regiment (:ru:80-й гвардейский танковый полк), Military Unit Number 87441 (Chebarkul). The regiment traces its history to the 80th Tank Brigade of the 20th Tank Corps. NKO Directive No. 723190ss of January 21, 1942 ordered its establishment at Sormovo, Gorky Oblast. It fought among the ranks of the Active Army for five periods from April 1942 to 1945. It gained the "Guards" title after the beginning of the 2022 Russian invasion of Ukraine.
 239th Guards Tank Red Banner Order of Suvorov, Kutuzov, Alexander Nevsky Orenburg Cossack Regiment 
 228th Motorized Rifle Regiment
 400th Transylvania Self-Propelled Artillery Regiment
 Anti-Aircraft Regiment

Equipment
Equipment in 2018: T-72A/B/BA/B3, BMP-2, BTR-82A, Grad MLRS, TOS-1, 2S12, 2S3.

Commanders 
 Colonel/Major General (Guards) Denis Igorevich Lyamin (2016–2017)
 Major General (Guards) Vyacheslav Nikolayevich Gurov (2017–2019)
 Major General (Guards) Vitaly Petrovich Gerasimov (2019–2020)
 Colonel (Guards) Ivan Mikhailovich Shkanov (Septembre 2020 – July 2021)
 Colonel (Guards) Ramil Rakhmatulovich Ibatullin (since July 2021)

Notes

Tank divisions of Russia
Military units and formations established in 2016
Military units and formations awarded the Order of the Red Banner

no:90. stridsvogndivisjon
nn:90. stridsvogndivisjon
ru:90-я гвардейская танковая дивизия
uk:90-та танкова дивізія (РФ)